
Murillo Lake is a lake in the Manuripi Province, Pando Department, Bolivia.

References 

Lakes of Pando Department